Kaonium is an exotic atom consisting of a bound state of a positively charged and a negatively charged kaon.  Kaonium has not been observed experimentally and is expected to have a short lifetime on the order of 10−18 seconds.

References

Onia
Mesons
Nuclear physics